The  is an archaeological site with the ruins of a Nara to Heian period government administrative complex located in what is now part of the city of  Tsukuba in Ibaraki prefecture in the northern Kantō region of Japan. The site has been protected as a National Historic Site from 1980.

Overview
Each of the units had an administrative complex built on a semi-standardized layout based on contemporary Chinese design.

The Hirasawa site approximately corresponds to this location.

The site was discovered in 1975 during preliminary construction for a housing complex. It was excavated by the Ibaraki Prefecture Board of Education from 1973 to 1975 for the purpose of collecting materials for the restoration and development of a historical park from 1993 to 1994. During these excavations, the foundations for 55 buried pillar buildings, four foundation pillar buildings, and traces of  moat, palisade and some 25 pit dwellings were discovered. The layout of the buildings in a "U" shape corresponds to that of the standardized administrative center format. Most of the buildings are believed to have been raised floor granaries for the purpose of storing taxation rice, and were arranged orderly in two groups. Aside from the Haji ware pottery from the site of the pit dwellings, a small amount of earthenware and Sue ware were found, as well as roof tile fragments. Carbonized rice was excavated from some of the pillar holes, indicating that the site was destroyed by fire, but the quantity of earthenware and roof tile fragments was relatively few. The pit dwellings were found to date from the late Jōmon period, indicating that a settlement had existed on this site from long before the expanding Yamato state had decided to make this site a regional administrative center.

The restored warehouse is mentioned in ancient literature, and its restoration was based on the design of a similar structure at the ancient temple of Horyu-ji in Ikaruga, Nara, with earthen walls. The roof on the restoration is thatch, as the quantity of roof tile fragments recovered from the ruins of the foundation would not be enough to justify a tile roof design. The site is located a 30-minute walk from the "kyū Tsukuba chōsha" bus stop on the Tsukuba Bus from Tsukuba Station.

Gallery

See also
List of Historic Sites of Japan (Ibaraki)

References

External links

Ibaraki Prefectural Department of Education 
Ibaraki prefecture Cultural Information  

History of Ibaraki Prefecture
Nara period
Heian period
Tsukuba, Ibaraki
Archaeological sites in Japan
Historic Sites of Japan
Hitachi Province